Group A of EuroBasket 2022 consisted of Belgium, Bulgaria, Georgia, Montenegro, Spain, and Turkey. The games were played from 1 to 7 September 2022 at the newly built Tbilisi Arena in Tbilisi, Georgia. The top four teams advanced to the knockout stage.

Teams
After the 2022 Russian invasion of Ukraine, Russia was expelled from the tournament and replaced by Montenegro.

Notes

Russia was expelled due to the Russian invasion of Ukraine.

Standings

Matches
All times are local (UTC+4).

Spain vs Bulgaria

Turkey vs Montenegro

Belgium vs Georgia

Montenegro vs Belgium

Bulgaria vs Turkey

Georgia vs Spain

Bulgaria vs Montenegro

Spain vs Belgium

Turkey vs Georgia
After a scuffle between Furkan Korkmaz and Duda Sanadze, both players were ejected. Korkmaz was reportedly attacked when leaving the arena by Georgian players. The following day, the Turkish federation threatened to leave the tournament.

After the game, the Turkish federation also submitted a complaint because the game clock ran for 22 seconds while the game was paused; this complaint was dismissed by FIBA.

Belgium vs Turkey

Montenegro vs Spain

Georgia vs Bulgaria

Turkey vs Spain

Bulgaria vs Belgium

Georgia vs Montenegro

References

External links
Official website

Group A